Cooper's Green is a village in the civil parish of Buxted in the Wealden district of East Sussex, England.

Villages in East Sussex
Buxted